Xianxia is a town in Ningguo, Anhui province, China. , it administers the following seven villages:
Xianxia Village
Kongfu Village
Longting Village
Yangshan Village
Panzhang Village
Longmen Village
Shiling Village

References

Township-level divisions of Anhui
Ningguo